Albert Waterall (3 March 1890 – 1963) was an English footballer who played in the Football League for Clapton Orient, Notts County, Queens Park Rangers and Stockport County.

Personal life
In September 1915, a year after the beginning of the First World War, Waterall attested in the Army Reserve. Between February and June 1918, when he was discharged as "no longer fit for war service", he served as a sapper in the Sherwood Foresters and the Inland Waterways and Docks section of the Royal Engineers.

References

1890 births
1963 deaths
English footballers
Association football midfielders
English Football League players
Carlton Town F.C. players
Notts County F.C. players
Stockport County F.C. players
Queens Park Rangers F.C. players
Leyton Orient F.C. players
Grantham Town F.C. players
Footballers from Nottingham
British Army personnel of World War I
Sherwood Foresters soldiers
Royal Engineers soldiers
Military personnel from Nottinghamshire